Mount Blane is a mountain in western British Columbia, Canada, located east of Kitlope Lake and southeast of the head of Whidbey Reach. It lies in the Kitlope Range, a subrange of the Kitimat Ranges which in turn form part of the Coast Mountains.

References

One-thousanders of British Columbia
Kitimat Ranges
Range 4 Coast Land District